Francis Dale "Hap" Moran (July 31, 1901 – December 30, 1994) was a collegiate and professional American football player. He played mainly at halfback for Carnegie Tech (1922), Grinnell College (1923–1925), the Frankford Yellow Jackets (1926), the Chicago Cardinals (1927), the Pottsville Maroons (1928), and the New York Giants (1929–1933).  When he retired from the NFL in 1933, he held the league records for the longest run from scrimmage (91 yards against the Green Bay Packers on November 23, 1930) and most yards receiving in a single game (114 yards against the Philadelphia Eagles on October 15, 1933).  His 91-yard run remained a New York Giants record for 75 years until it was broken by Tiki Barber on December 31, 2005.

Playing career

High school
Although he eventually made his name in football, Moran was better known in high school for basketball.  He was captain of the Iowa All-State team in 1920, and his team from Boone represented Iowa at the National Interscholastic Tournament at the University of Chicago, where he was named a High School All-American by Amos Alonzo Stagg.

Collegiate
He was recruited by Carnegie Tech in Pittsburgh primarily for basketball, but also played football. In the 1922 Carnegie–Notre Dame game, the Four Horsemen first formed up as a backfield under the coaching of Knute Rockne.  Moran would also play against the Four Horsemen in their last game together in 1930, when the Notre Dame All-Stars faced the New York Giants in a charity game which raised $115,000 to benefit New York City's unemployed.

In 1923 Moran returned to Iowa and played football and basketball for Grinnell College.  As a passer his favorite receiver was Morgan Taylor, who won the first gold medal for the United States in the 1924 Olympics in Paris running the 400-meter hurdles.

Professional

In 1926 Moran was hired by Frankford Yellow Jackets' Coach Guy Chamberlin, and his first professional game was against Akron, led by Fritz Pollard, the All-American from Brown University, one of the few black players in the NFL.  Moran scored Frankford's only points of the game and earned a starting spot as halfback.  Frankford won the NFL Championship that season, and Moran was their second-highest scorer.

Moran played the first part of the 1927 season with the Yellow Jackets and was then recruited by the Chicago Cardinals, primarily for his kicking skills.  He was ranked second in the league for field goals and ninth for points after touchdowns that year.  In 1928 he played in the backfield for the Pottsville Maroons with John McNally, better known as Johnny Blood. After New York Giants' lineman Steve Owen knocked himself unconscious trying to tackle Moran, the Giants invited him to join their team for the last game of the 1928 season.  Moran stayed with the Giants for the next five seasons.

In the course of his career Moran started at halfback, tailback, wingback, quarterback, blocking back, defensive back and linebacker.

In 1930 Moran set the NFL record for the longest run from scrimmage, in 1931 he was the Giants' scoring leader, and in 1933 he set the NFL record for the most yards receiving in a single game. After retiring from the NFL he played for the Paterson Panthers of the American Association, and coached the Panthers in 1936. After his football career, he was a buyer for Western Electric, living in Sunnyside, Queens, New York and coaching a youth football team there.

References

External links
Player Profile at The Professional Football Researchers Association
NFL Player Stats
Pro-Football-Reference.com
Hap Moran.org

1901 births
1994 deaths
American football running backs
Carnegie Mellon Tartans football players
Chicago Cardinals players
Frankford Yellow Jackets players
Grinnell Pioneers football players
People from Belle Plaine, Iowa
People from Sunnyside, Queens
Players of American football from Iowa
Pottsville Maroons players
New York Giants players
Burials in Connecticut
Grinnell College alumni